Imre Sátori (7 March 1937 – 30 November 2010) was a Hungarian footballer. He competed in the men's tournament at the 1960 Summer Olympics, winning the bronze medal.

References

External links
 

1937 births
2010 deaths
Hungarian footballers
Olympic footballers of Hungary
Footballers at the 1960 Summer Olympics
Footballers from Budapest
Association football forwards
Medalists at the 1960 Summer Olympics
Olympic bronze medalists for Hungary
Olympic medalists in football